Robber's Cave (locally known as Guchhupani), located near Sahasradhara (thousand fold spring), is a river cave formation in Himalaya, located approximately 8 km from the centre of Dehradun City in Uttarakhand state of India.

The cave is about 600 metres long, and divided into two main parts. The cave has a highest fall of about 10 metres. In the central part there is a fort wall structure which is now broken. It consists of an extremely narrow gorge formed in a conglomerate limestone area on Doon Valley's Dehra plateau.

It is a natural cave formation where rivers flow inside the cave. The place is a popular tourist spot and which is now being maintained by Uttarakhand State. Local bus services are available up to Anarwala Village, from where it is a kilometre's trek away.

History 
Gachhu Pani is situated in a vast limestone area in the Dehra plateau in Dehradun. You can see similar caves in Sahastradhara of Dehradun. Gucchu pani (robber's Cave) is a narrow gorge also known as Nero Gauge Cave, the area is an example of chosen stone construction. The late 1800s Robber's Cave is used by robbers to hide from the British. Due to the natural and local condition of this cave, it was easiest for the robbers to hide here. Labyrinth caves were suitable for robbers to hide here, which is why it came to be known as robber's Cave. It is believed by the locals that the place was used by the robbers for hiding their lootings.

References

External links

 Exploring Robbers cave

Geography of Dehradun
Caves of Uttarakhand
Tourist attractions in Dehradun
Tourist attractions in Uttarakhand